The National Independent Soccer Association (NISA) is a professional men's soccer league in the United States. The league is in the third tier of American soccer and began play in 2019. NISA initially used a fall-to-spring season format with a winter break but have switched to spring-to-fall which is more common in the United States.

History

League beginnings

On June 6, 2017, it was announced that the newly formed National Independent Soccer Association would begin play in 2018 targeting an initial 8 to 10 teams, later revised to 8 to 12 teams. Initially, the league outlined plans to introduce a promotion/relegation system, once they reach their goal of 24 teams, the first in US professional soccer and in doing so act as a feeder league to the North American Soccer League (NASL); however, the NASL ceased operations prior to those plans being implemented.

On February 13, 2018, NISA co-founder Jack Cummins died suddenly. On May 17, 2018, NISA co-founder Peter Wilt left the NISA to help start up Forward Madison FC in Madison, Wisconsin in USL League One. A committee of club owners has been formed to elect new leadership within the organization.

Reorganization and start of play
On August 31, 2018, NISA filed an application with the United States Soccer Federation for sanctioning as a men's professional league, playing at the third division. On February 16, 2019, NISA was provisionally sanctioned as a Division III league by the United States Soccer Federation. In May 2019, it was announced that clubs were not happy with the silence from the league and that Bob Watkins was no longer the President of NISA and that John Prutch had taken the helm as commissioner. During this same timeframe, the league's start date was pushed back from August 2019 to a targeted September start date.

On June 10, 2019, it became known that both Miami FC and California United Strikers FC were approved at the recent board of governors meeting to join NISA, while the previously identified club in Central Florida would play in Baton Rouge, Louisiana instead of Daytona Beach, Florida. However, it was unclear whether either of the teams would start before the league's September start date. On June 27, 2019, it was announced that Oakland Roots SC would have their inaugural season with the league in the spring season, rather than the previously announced NPSL Founders Cup. On August 15, 2019, the league officially announced the addition of Oakland Roots for the 2019 season and Chattanooga FC, Detroit City FC, and Michigan Stars FC for early 2020.

The inaugural season began on August 31, 2019, with a 3–3 draw for Oakland Roots SC and California United Strikers FC in Oakland. On April 27, 2020, following previous postponements, the remainder of the 2019–20 season was canceled due to the COVID-19 pandemic.

On September 10, 2020, the league announced that one of the original co-founders of the league, Peter Wilt, would be rejoining the league in a club operations capacity by attempting to establish a club in Chicago. On September 15, 2020, one of the founding teams, Oakland Roots, announced that they were leaving the league to join the USL Championship a league in the second division of professional soccer.

Development of the amateur and semi-professional game
On April 27, 2020, NISA revealed a new tournament called the NISA Independent Cup that would have member teams face off against high quality amateur and independent professional sides in a regional format. The tournament and 15 participating teams were announced on July 1.

NISA announced its first affiliation agreement with the Gulf Coast Premier League, a USASA affiliated amateur league based in the gulf coast of the United States, on August 13, 2020. The partnership is set to provide a pathway to professional status for both clubs and players, while also allowing two GCPL teams to qualify for future editions of the Independent Cup based on league play. This was expanded to include the Midwest Premier League and Eastern Premier Soccer League on September 3 and 4, 2020, respectively. On November 23, NISA announced a fourth agreement with the Mountain Premier League.

On September 17, 2020, the league announced that it was establishing a full-year amateur league, the NISA Nation, that would serve as an incubator for amateur and semi-professional clubs that wish to move into NISA's professional league. NISA stated that this full-season amateur league and its previously announced league affiliations would serve as the foundation of a fully open professional to amateur pyramid in the United States.

The league announced an "alliance" with semi-professional women's soccer league United Women's Soccer on January 28, 2021, with the target of launching a professional women's league in 2022. This proposed league would occupy the at the time vacant second tier of professional women's soccer in the United States. Many NISA clubs, including Detroit City FC, Michigan Stars FC, and NJ Teamsterz FC field or had announced fielding UWS and UWS2 teams. However, on March 20, 2021, it was reported that the alliance had broken down and the leagues had gone their separate ways.

Teams

Current

Location map

Former

Timeline

Champions

Teams that no longer participate in the National Independent Soccer Association are in italics.

NISA Finals results

NISA Independent Cup Champions

NISA Nation and affiliates

In addition to its professional division, NISA operates a full-season amateur league called NISA Nation. NISA's stated long-term goal is to have promotion and relegation between the professional division and NISA Nation, as well as between NISA Nation and seven affiliated regional leagues. Some of those affiliated leagues have entered into promotion and relegation agreements with other leagues, and so a pyramid can be constructed with NISA's Division III professional league at the top.

Cascadia Premier League

Eastern Premier Soccer League

Gulf Coast Premier League

Midwest Premier League

Mountain Premier League

Southwest Premier League

See also
NISA Nation
United Soccer League, operator of several leagues in the US system, including:
USL Championship, the current second level
USL League One, also playing at the third level
NPSL Members Cup
Soccer in the United States
Professional sports leagues in the United States

Notes

References

External links

 
3
Third level association football leagues in North America
Professional soccer leagues in the United States
Summer association football leagues